Costalegre ("Coast of Joy" in Spanish) is a series of different beaches, capes and bays of various sizes distributed alongside the Pacific Ocean on the western coastline of the Mexican state of Jalisco, between Puerto Vallarta, Jalisco and Manzanillo, Colima.

History
The Spanish used Bahía de Navidad for ship building, repairs, and as a jumping off point to the Philippines in the mid-16th century. 

In the 1990s, the Jalisco state government has promoted this zone as a tourist attraction, grouping all these beaches under the common name of "Costalegre".

Hurricane Patricia
On October 23, 2015, Costalegre was hit by the category 5 storm Hurricane Patricia, which was the most powerful cyclone ever measured in the Western Hemisphere with sustained wind speeds of up to 320 km/h (200 mph). Hurricane Patricia made landfall October 23 at 7:45pm with catastrophic damage. The center of the storm hit Cuixmala in Costalegre.

Costalegre Bays and Beaches

Bahía de Banderas (Flag's Bay)
Officially, not a part of Costalegre itself, but separates Puerto Vallarta from the rest of the coast, and marks the top most northern point of Costalegre.

Cabo Corrientes (Cape of Currents)
Founded in 1944, Cabo Corrientes is a Municipality with over 80 kilometers of scenic highways and 200.106 hectares of forest surrounded by rivers and cascades. Some of its beaches are already very well known due to its proximity to Puerto Vallarta, like Las Ánimas, Quimixto and Yelapa, often considered as part of Vallarta by the tourists, but which are in fact just a minor part of the large Cabo Corrientes's coast. The Tuito is the municipal head of Cabo Corrientes and the oldest population of the municipality. The ruins of the Ex-Hacienda San José are an attraction that dates from 1875; as well as the ancient petroglyphs in Las Juntas and Los Veranos.

In Boca de Tomatlán, pangas (taxi boats) take tourists to the beaches.

Las Ánimas — is a sand beach in a zone suitable for diving, with coral formations and the associated marine fauna.

Quimixto —  Between Quimixto and Yelapa there are small beaches such as Las Caletas, Majahuitas and Colimilla. S with coral formations and the associated marine fauna.

Yelapa — A large creek where the Tuito river ends. It has a small and traditional town.

Mayto — More than 15 kilometers of beach. Here is located one of the largest of Mexico's protected sea turtles reproduction fields, part of the international Sea Turtle Restoration Project where guided routes are offered to know a little more about the species that arrive at this beach. On scheduled times, it is possible to participate in the release of newborn turtle babies to the sea.

Tehuamixtle — A place known for its large oysters, has a beach about 200 meters long.

Costa Majahuas
A long coast with several beaches: Punta Las Peñitas, Hotelito Desconocido, Majahuas, Peñitas y Chalacatepec.

Chalacatepec — is a beach 25 minutes from the municipal head of Tomatlán. On its shore there is a pirate ship wrecked long ago which now forms part of the traditional legends of the place.
La Peñita Pintada — (Painted Lil'Rock) gained its name due to a natural granodiorite cavity, whose walls, bottom and ceiling have several ancient paintings on them. Owing to the large number of visitors, there are visitor periods scheduled only on specific times of the year.

Bahía de Chamela
A large, undeveloped bay surrounded by several islands. Home to marine and terrestrial birds, it has more than ten kilometers of varied marine and fluvial scenes. It has an assembly of small islands like La Colorada, Cocinas, San Andrés, Pajarera (reserve of exotic birds and ideal place for diving), Novilla, Esfinge, San Pedro, San Agustín, and La Negrita, all of them accessible by boat.

Costa Careyes
Costa Careyes is a private community located on the South Coast of Jalisco on Highway 200 Melaque – Puerto Vallarta at Kilometer 53. There are several beaches in the Careyes Bay. Teopa Beach is the largest and includes a sea turtle preservation sanctuary[1]. The community was founded in 1968 by Gian Franco Brignone[2] as his private estate. The Castles, Villas, Casitas, Bungalows and Restaurants that comprise Careyes today function as a resort and are known for the "Careyes Style" of architecture.

Cuixmala 
Cuixmala is 10 minutes of the south Careyes, in the vegetation of a 3 km beach. It was the private estate of James Goldsmith, and was originally conceived as a private home for his family and friends. Originally designed by Robert Couturier, it is now an eco-resort based on green culture.

Bahía de Tenacatita
Some kilometers ahead of Tamarindo Beach, it is located Bahía de Tenacatita, one of largest bays of the Mexican Coast. This zone has crab, snail, clam, lobster and squid fishing, according to the time of the year. Both sunrise and sunset can be seen over the sea during winter. It has seven beaches: Manzanilla, Boca de Iguanas, Los Ángeles Locos, Punta Serena, Tenacatita and Tecuán.

Bahía de Navidad
This is the most urban developed bay, located at the south of Costalegre series of beaches. It has a traditional town named Barra de Navidad with a population of 7000+, a small farming and fishing community located on the east end of the Bahía de Navidad, 60 km north of Manzanillo. The beachfront fronting the sandbar arcs toward San Patricio, Jalisco 4.5 kilometers to the west.

The large lagoon behind Barra de Navidad is criss-crossed by small fishing boats gathering scallops and transporting visitors and locals from Barra to Isla Navidad and the Grand Bay Hotel, recently voted the Number One hotel/resort in Mexico by the Travel Channel. Taxi boats also carry passengers to and from the small community of Colimilla where restaurants line the shore.

Melaque — Towards the northwest of Bahía de Navidad, is the extensive beach of Melaque, of smooth surge, regular slope and sand of texture average gilded gray color. Melaque is conformed by the towns of San Patricio and Villa Obregón, this last one also has its own series of small beaches known as "Beaches of the Sun". The locality of San Patricio takes its name from the Irish Saint Patrick, and celebrates him on Saint Patrick's Day, 17 March.

Cuastecomate — A beach of fine gray sand that extends throughout 250 meters. 

Tamarindo is a peninsula in the middle of the Pacific Ocean. It has a professional 18-hole golf course south of Tenacatitla. A 150-hectares ecological reserve where an extensive variety of animals coexist, including armadillos, iguanas, deer, raccoons and many exotic birds.

Culture

Mariachi
Mariachi groups are usually hired for festive occasions.

Huichol people

In the north of Jalisco, the indigenous Huichol people live in towns in mountainous areas that are difficult to access.  They call themselves wixarica, "The People," in their own language. The name "Huichol" is derived from the name that was given to them by Nahuatl speakers. Along Constalegre it is possible to find Huichol handmade crafts, drapes and traditional toys.

Related to Nahuatl, the Huichol language belongs to the Coracholan branch of the Uto-Aztecan language family.

Gastronomy

Drinks
Jalisco is the center of the Mexican tequila industry. The areas in Jalisco that are covered in volcanic soil are utilised for the cultivation of the blue agave plant, which is used as the base for alcohols such as tequila.

Traditional alcoholic drinks Aguamiel and Pulque are made from maguey, similar to the plants used to produce tequila.

Along the streets of the town street vendors sell Tejuino, a cold beverage made from fermented corn. Tepache is also found on these places, a drink made out of the flesh and rind of the pineapple, sweetened with brown sugar and cinnamon. Both are slightly fermented and have a minimal alcohol content.

Traditional food
Dishes of Jalisco include Birria, (a spicy meat stew, made of goat, cow or iguana meat), red or white pozole, sopes, guacamole, frijoles charros, Menudo (stew made of hominy and tripe with a red chili base), torta ahogada (a Mexican sandwich "drowned" in a spicy sauce), Carne en su jugo, Enchiladas rojas y verdes, Cuachala (a chicken or pork stew), tamales, Lamb al pastor. The traditional Yelapa Pie is found only on Yelapa beach. Many kinds of fish and seafood are available in the large coastal region of Costalgre.

References

External links
Costalegre.com: official Costalegre website
 Costalegre.ca: Costalegre (travel guide)
  Barra de Navidad (official site)
  Costa Careyes (official site)
 Cuixmala webpage
 Carnaval webpage
 Costalegre Travel Guide

Beaches of Jalisco
Geography of Jalisco
Populated places in Jalisco
Tourist attractions in Jalisco